Portledge School is an independent college-preparatory day school located in Matinecock, New York with 414 students in Pre-nursery through 12th grade (2006–2007 school year).

History
Portledge was founded in 1965 in the Coffin estate in Locust Valley, NY. The estate was named after Portledge Manor, the Coffin family's ancestral home in England. Originally just the Carriage House (Middle School) and the Mansion (Lower School), the school built an Upper School (Gilmour Library), a Gym (Wellington Gym), Slanetz Science Center (SSC), and various sports fields over 40 years. Since 2000, the Middle School was completely rebuilt from an aging stable to a modern three level classroom and performance area complex. Most recently, a baseball and multipurpose field were constructed on lands backing up on Duck Pond Road. The school went through various headmasters in its early years until Hugh Gregory was hired. Responsible for growing the school from one without a unified grading system to a nationally accredited institution, Gregory served for 29 years. Afterwards, a search committee selected Steven Hahn, who served from 2006 until 2012. Simon Owen-Williams succeeded Mr. Hahn and is the current Headmaster of the school.

Academic honesty

At the beginning of each school year, the school requires student above grade five to sign an honor statement, which is reaffirmed before taking trimester exams. A disciplinary committee made up of students and faculty is organized each year in order to deal with breaches of this honor statement. The committee can formally only recommend a course of action; ultimate power lies with the Headmaster.

Faculty advisors
Faculty Advisers serve much the same duties as a commons teacher or a guidance counselor at any public facility, making sure their advisees are doing well academically while also offering any guidance that they might need.

Notable alumni

Jeremy Bracco (born 1997), ice hockey player
Joseph Duszak (born 1997), ice hockey player
Sonny Milano (born 1996), ice hockey player
Douglas Murray (born 1980), ice hockey player
Eric Nystrom (born 1983), ice hockey player
Ryan Vesce (born 1982), ice hockey player
Claude Zdanow, musician, composer, engineer, and entrepreneur

Athletics

Portledge offers many sports that are taught to students between fifth and twelfth grades, a number of which are not found in most public schools. Sports at Portledge include, but are not limited to, Boys' and Girls' Ice Hockey, Boys' and Girls' Soccer, Boys' and Girls' Tennis, Boys' and Girls' Crew, Boys' and Girls' Squash, Boys' and Girls' Lacrosse, Boys' and Girls' Cross Country, Boys' and Girls' Basketball, Girls' Softball, and Boys' baseball. In its past years, Portledge has been successful in sports competing in championship competition such as the International Private and Parochial Schools Athletic League. In 2015, the Boys' Hockey team won the inaugural Mid-Atlantic Hockey League (MAHL) Championship over The Hill School by a score of 8-6. Recently Portledge has been donated a new softball field by the parents of the Portledge Community for girls of the softball team to use during their softball season, while previously having to use the facilities of other schools for softball games. Former New York Islanders goaltender and NHL first overall pick Rick DiPietro is the current head coach of the Boys' Hockey team.

References

External links

 

Educational institutions established in 1965
Preparatory schools in New York (state)
Private high schools in New York (state)
Private middle schools in New York (state)
Private elementary schools in New York (state)
Schools in Nassau County, New York
1965 establishments in New York (state)